Jean-Sébastien Dea (born February 8, 1994) is a Canadian professional ice hockey centre who is currently playing for the Tucson Roadrunners in the American Hockey League (AHL) while under contract to the Arizona Coyotes of the National Hockey League (NHL).

Playing career
As a youth, Dea played in the 2007 Quebec International Pee-Wee Hockey Tournament with a minor ice hockey team from Saint-Laurent, Quebec. Undrafted, Dea played major junior hockey with the Rouyn-Noranda Huskies in the Quebec Major Junior Hockey League before agreeing to a three-year entry-level contract with the Pittsburgh Penguins on September 17, 2013.

Dea made his pro debut for Wilkes-Barre/Scranton on April 19, 2014.

Dea spent the 2014–15 season between the AHL and the ECHL.

Nearing the conclusion of the 2016–17 regular season, Dea received his first recall from Wilkes-Barre/Scranton to Pittsburgh on April 9, 2017. He made his NHL debut that night in the Penguins final regular season game, recording 2 penalty minutes in a 3–2 defeat to the New York Rangers. He was returned to the AHL following the game for the post-season with Wilkes-Barre.

On August 21, 2017, the Penguins re-signed Dea to a one-year, two-way contract worth $650,000. On January 17, 2018, Dea was called up to the Penguins and made his season debut against the Anaheim Ducks. He scored his first NHL goal on January 23, 2018, against the Carolina Hurricanes. He was sent back to the AHL on January 26, 2018, after playing in four games.

Eventually, just before free agency on June 28, 2018, Dea re-signed with the Penguins for a year. On September 28, Dea was claimed off waivers by the New Jersey Devils. After appearing in 20 games with the Devils, contributing with 3 goals and 5 points, Dea was again returned to waivers by the Devils. On November 29, Dea was re-claimed by the Penguins off waivers and was immediately re-assigned to the AHL with Wilkes-Barre/Scranton. He was later recalled and registered 1 goal in 3 games with Pittsburgh before he was again returned to Scranton.

Dea contributed with 6 goals and 22 points in 26 games for the Penguins in the AHL, before his second stint with Pittsburgh was cut short as he was dealt at the trade deadline to the Florida Panthers in exchange for Chris Wideman on February 25, 2019. In joining the Panther AHL affiliate, the Springfield Thunderbirds for the remainder of campaign, Dea scored a torrid 22 points in just 20 games.

As a free agent from the Panthers, Dea opted to sign a two-year, two-way contract with the Buffalo Sabres on July 1, 2019.

Following the conclusion of his contract with the Sabres, Dea returned to Canada in agreeing a one-year, two-way contract with the Montreal Canadiens on July 28, 2021.

On July 14, 2022, Dea was signed as a free agent to a two-year, two-way contract with the Arizona Coyotes.

Career statistics

References

External links
 
 
 

1994 births
Living people
Arizona Coyotes players
Buffalo Sabres players
Canadian ice hockey centres
Ice hockey people from Quebec
Laval Rocket players
New Jersey Devils players
Pittsburgh Penguins players
Rochester Americans players
Rouyn-Noranda Huskies players
Sportspeople from Laval, Quebec
Springfield Thunderbirds players
Tucson Roadrunners players
Undrafted National Hockey League players
Wheeling Nailers players
Wilkes-Barre/Scranton Penguins players